Nils Kristen Jacobsen (born 13 August 1908 in Skjervøy, died 25 January 1993) was a Norwegian politician for the Labour Party.

He was elected to the Parliament of Norway from Troms in 1945, and was re-elected on six occasions.

Jacobsen was deputy mayor of Skjervøy in 1934–1937.

References

1908 births
1993 deaths
Labour Party (Norway) politicians
Members of the Storting
20th-century Norwegian politicians
People from Skjervøy